Peter Bennett may refer to:

 Peter Bennett, 1st Baron Bennett of Edgbaston (1880–1957), British Conservative party politician
 Peter Bennett (music promoter) (1935–2012), American music promoter and cousin of singer Tony Bennett
 Peter Bennett (English footballer) (born 1946), English former footballer
 Peter B. Bennett (born 1931), American doctor and founder of the Divers Alert Network
 Peter Bennett (footballer, born 1926) (1926–2012), St Kilda VFL footballer
 Peter Bennett (footballer, born 1956), Hawthorn and Essendon VFL footballer
 Pete Bennett (born 1982), winner of the British Big Brother series 7 and Tourette's sufferer
 Peter Bennett (producer), British television producer and first assistant director
 Peter Bennett (diplomat), New Zealand diplomat
 Peter Bennett (actor) (1917–1989), British stage and television actor
 Pete Bennett (Canadian football) (1928–1993), Canadian football player
 Peter Bennett (soccer) (born 1969), Australian soccer player